Morigny-Champigny is a commune in the Essonne department in Île-de-France in northern France.

Inhabitants of Morigny-Champigny are known as Morignacois.

Geography
The village lies on the right bank of the Juine, which flows northward through the western part of the commune.

See also
Communes of the Essonne department
Thiou of Morigny, French chronicler

References

External links

Official website 

Mayors of Essonne Association 

Communes of Essonne